Simulated reality is a common theme in science fiction. It should not be confused with the theme of virtual reality.

Literature

Theater
 Possible Worlds (1990) and the 2000 film adaptation
 World of Wires (2012), directed by Jay Scheib.

Comics and anime

Film

Television

 Altered Carbon, Set in a future where consciousness is digitized and stored, a prisoner returns to life in a new body and must solve a mind-bending murder to win his freedom.
 Agents of S.H.I.E.L.D., the third arc of the 4th season focuses on the characters trapped within a simulated reality.
Arrowverse
"Invasion!" a crossover of Supergirl, The Flash, Arrow and Legends of Tomorrow.
 Ascension - A Netflix mini-series about 600 people who believe they live on a spaceship halfway to Proxima Centauri, but who are actually trapped in a simulated environment on Earth.
 Babylon 5, part of the episode "The Deconstruction of Falling Stars" features a holographic simulation of the Babylon station, including initially faithful reproductions of the key characters, their knowledge and personalities but with the intention to recreate falsified versions for propaganda purposes.
 Black Mirror
 "White Bear"
 "White Christmas"
 "Playtest"
 "San Junipero"
 "USS Callister"
 "Hang the DJ"
 Navarasa episode "Project Agni" by Karthick Naren
 Doctor Who episode "The Deadly Assassin" (1976), written by Robert Holmes.
The Expanse, episodes "Caliban's war"(first appearance of 'The investigator' as a simulation in Holden's mind because of the protomolecule) and "Home"(Last appearance of the investigator)
 Matrix computer from the Doctor Who universe.
 Doctor Who episodes "Forest of the Dead" and "Extremis", written by Steven Moffat and "Amy's Choice", written by Simon Nye.
 Farscape episode "John Quixote" (2002) places the lead character in a virtual reality game.
 The Flash (2014)
 "Duet" a crossover of The Flash and Supergirl.
 Devs (2020)
 Harsh Realm (1999) was a science fiction television series about humans trapped inside a virtual reality simulation. It was developed by Chris Carter, creator of The X-Files and Millennium.
 Infinity Train (2019-2021), an animated series set on a train of infinite number of cars, where each car hosts different environments that seems to be artificially generated.
 Kiss Me First (2018)
 Legends of Tomorrow (2016)
 "Here I Go Again", an episode from the third season 
 Life on Mars (2008-2009), The U.S. TV series 
 The Orville episodes "Firestorm", "Ja'loja", "Primal Urges" and "Lasting Impressions".
 The Outer Limits episode "The Sentence" (1996)
 The Prisoner (1967-1968)
 Red Dwarf episodes "Better Than Life", "Back to Reality", "Gunmen of the Apocalypse", "Stoke Me a Clipper", "Blue", "Beyond a Joke" and "Back in the Red" by Rob Grant and/or Doug Naylor with Paul Alexander, Kim Fuller and Robert Llewellyn all feature some sort of artificial reality or "total immersion video game".
 Solar Opposites episode Retrace-Your-Step-Alizer (2020) features the Pretend-O-Deck a device capable of simulating realities similar to the Holodeck found in Star Trek.
 Star Trek: The Next Generation
 Episode "Future Imperfect" (1990): During an away mission, Commander William Riker loses consciousness; he awakes sixteen years in the future with that period of his memory lost; he is now the new Captain of the Enterprise, is widowed and has a son named Jean-Luc (after Picard); this eventually turns out to be a simulated reality.
 Episode "The Inner Light" (1992): Jean-Luc Picard is rendered unconscious by a probe of unknown origin. Within the span of 25 minutes, he lives the life of a scientist named Kamin from the doomed planet of Kataan whose sun had gone nova 1000 years before.  The probe contains the stored memories of Kataan's civilization which Picard relives as Kamin.
 Episode "Ship in a Bottle" (1993): The fictional Professor Moriarty of Sir Arthur Conan Doyle's Sherlock Holmes stories is allowed to exist in a holodeck simulation of the world.
 Star Trek: The Original Series episodes "The Cage" and "The Menagerie", the unaired pilot and later episode (respectively).
 Star Trek: Voyager: Several episodes took place in the holodeck, including "Fair Haven", "Spirit Folk", the two part episode "The Killing Game" and "Projections".
 Stargate SG-1 episode "The Gamekeeper"
Supergirl episode "For the Girl Who Has Everything", based on the Superman story "For the Man Who Has Everything", which was written by Alan Moore and Dave Gibbons for Superman Annual #11 published by DC Comics in 1985.
 The Twilight Zone (1959), and its later revivals, feature a number of episodes involving false or simulated realities of some sort. Examples include "Where Is Everybody?" and "Dreams for Sale".
Upload (TV series) (2020) Is set in 2033, when humans are able to "upload" themselves into a virtual afterlife of their choosing. When computer programmer Nathan dies prematurely, he is uploaded to the very expensive Lake View, but soon finds himself under the thumb of his possessive, still-living girlfriend Ingrid.
The X-Files
"Kill Switch" 
"First Person Shooter"
"Field Trip"
"Wetwired"
 WandaVision (2021), miniseries.
 Westworld (2016-2022)
 Wild Palms (1993), miniseries.

Computer and video games

 .hack series
 13 Sentinels: Aegis Rim
 Active Worlds
 AI: The Somnium Files – Nirvana Initiative
 Alternate Reality
 Assassin's Creed
 Astral Chain
 Battleborn
 Chrono Trigger
 Creatures
 Custom Robo
 Cyberpunk 2077
 Danganronpa 2
 Danganronpa V3
 Darwinia
 Destiny
 Deus Ex
 Digital Devil Saga
 Doki Doki Literature Club
 Enter the Matrix
 Eternal Sonata
 Fallout 3
 Harvester
 Kingdom Hearts coded
 Knight Orc
 The Matrix: Path of Neo
 Max Payne
 Metal Gear Solid 2: Sons of Liberty
 A Mind Forever Voyaging
 No Man's Sky
 Omikron: The Nomad Soul
 Outer Wilds: Echoes of the Eye
 Persona
 Planescape: Torment
 Prey (2017 video game)
 Saints Row IV
 Second Life
 Shadowrun
 Shin Megami Tensei
 SOMA
 Star Ocean: Till the End of Time
 Star Wars: The Old Republic
 The Evil Within
 The Simpsons Game
 The Sims
 The World Ends with You
 Sonic Forces (Episode Shadow)
 There.com
 Thimbleweed Park
 Stellaris
 Ultima series
 Xenoblade Chronicles series
 Xenosaga series

See also 
 Astral plane
 Astral projection
 Dream world (plot device)
 Hallucination
 Illusion
 List of films featuring time loops
 Simulated reality
 Vision (spirituality)

References

 
Lists of fictional things
Lists of fictional locations